Angers is an L6 meteorite that hit Pays de la Loire, France in 1822. The meteor struck at 8:15 PM on 3 June. It has since been stored along with L'Aigle, another meteorite that struck France 19 years earlier, on 26 April 1803, in a room at the Muséum d’histoire naturelle d’Angers, a French natural history museum.

Classification
It is classified as L6-ordinary chondrite.

See also
 Glossary of meteoritics

References

Meteorites found in France
Angers
1822 in France